Raicunda (? - 512), also known as Radikunda, Radegunda or Ranikunda was a Lombardic queen consort.

She was the daughter of the Thurinigian king Bisinus and his Lombard wife Menia. She had three brothers named in the sources, Hermanafrid, Bertachar and Baderic, who divided the Thuringian kingdom after the death of their father. Raicunda went with her mother to the kingdom of the Lombards. She married the Lombard king Wacho, but died in 512 AD before leaving any children.

Sources
 Michael Kirchschlager: Runibergun. Vom Königreich der Thüringer. Verlag Kirchschlager, Arnstadt 2009, S. 23
 Helmut Castritius, Dieter Geuenich, Matthias Werner (Hrsg.): Die Frühzeit der Thüringer. Archäologie, Sprache, Geschichte (= Reallexikon der Germanischen Altertumskunde. Ergänzungsband Nr. 63). Walter de Gruyter, Berlin/New York 2009, .

Year of birth unknown
512 deaths
Lombardic queens consort
Thuringian women
6th-century women